The 1997–98 season of the Venezuelan Primera División, the top category of Venezuelan football, was played by 12 teams. The national champions were Atlético Zulia.

Torneo Apertura

Torneo Clausura

Final Playoff

Copa CONMEBOL Playoff

External links
Venezuela 1998 season at RSSSF

Venezuelan Primera División seasons
Ven
Ven
1997–98 in Venezuelan football